Battle of Port Royal may refer to:

 The Battle of Port Royal (1690), Acadia, in King William's War
 The Siege of Port Royal (1707), Acadia, in Queen Anne's War
 The Siege of Port Royal (1710), Acadia, in Queen Anne's War
 The Siege of Annapolis Royal (1744), Nova Scotia, in King George's War (Annapolis Royal was formerly Port Royal, Acadia)
 The 1779 Battle of Port Royal Island, South Carolina, in the American Revolutionary War
 The 1861 Battle of Port Royal, South Carolina, in the American Civil War